Sugar Ridge can refer to:
Sugar Ridge Township, Clay County, Indiana
Sugar Ridge, Ohio